Acalyptris terrificus is a moth of the family Nepticulidae. It is only known from the Pacific Coast in the Oaxaca region in Mexico.

The habitat consists of secondary forests.

The wingspan is about 4.2 mm. Adults are on wing from November to December.

References

External links
Taxonomic checklist of Nepticulidae of Mexico, with the description of three new species from the Pacific Coast (Insecta, Lepidoptera)

Nepticulidae
Endemic Lepidoptera of Mexico
Moths described in 2009